Renshou Giant Buddha (仁寿大佛), also called Niujiaozhai Giant Buddha (牛角寨大佛) is a large stone Buddha located within Renshou county, Sichuan. It is 60 kilometers south of Chengdu. The Buddha was carved in 707 during the Tang Dynasty. It was constructed six years earlier in the nearby famous Leshan Giant Buddha. Located around the statue are over 101 shrines belonging to Confucianism, Daoist, and Buddhist.

References 

Outdoor sculptures in China
Colossal Buddha statues
Mountain monuments and memorials
World Heritage Sites in China
Rock art in China